Antonino Pascual Roman (May 31, 1939 – January 8, 2014) was a Filipino politician from Bataan. A member of the House of Representatives of the Philippines, he represented the 1st District of Bataan from 1998 until 2007, when his wife, Herminia Roman, took over the seat. Roman was an assemblyman from 1978 to 1986. He was also a Finance Deputy Minister under Finance Minister Cesar Virata, and Presidential Legislative Liaison Office (PLLO) Secretary from 2010 to 2012 under President Benigno Aquino III. 

As a member of Congress, Roman served as the chairman of the House committee on veterans affairs and welfare, and the vice chairman of the special committee on bases conversion, as well as the committee on natural resources. 

Roman died on January 8, 2014, of multiple organ failure. He was 74.

References

See also
Personal Profile 

1939 births
2014 deaths
Liberal Party (Philippines) politicians
Members of the House of Representatives of the Philippines from Bataan
People from Bataan
Lakas–CMD (1991) politicians
20th-century Filipino lawyers
Colegio de San Juan de Letran alumni
Ateneo de Manila University alumni
New York University alumni
Members of the Batasang Pambansa